Vaclavas Kidykas (born 17 October 1961, in Klaipėda) is a retired male discus thrower from Lithuania. He placed third in the men's 1986 European Championships in Athletics in Stuttgart, West Germany with a throw of 65.5 meters and participated in four Olympic competitions. His longest throw, 68.44 meters, was recorded at a June 1988 event in Sochi.

Achievements

References
 Profile. International Amateur Athletic Federation.

1961 births
Living people
Athletes (track and field) at the 1988 Summer Olympics
Athletes (track and field) at the 1992 Summer Olympics
Athletes (track and field) at the 1996 Summer Olympics
Athletes (track and field) at the 2000 Summer Olympics
European Athletics Championships medalists
Lithuanian athletics coaches
Lithuanian male discus throwers
Olympic athletes of Lithuania
Olympic athletes of the Soviet Union
Soviet male discus throwers
Sportspeople from Klaipėda
Universiade medalists in athletics (track and field)
Universiade silver medalists for the Soviet Union
Medalists at the 1987 Summer Universiade